Bastiaan "Bas" Giling (born 4 November 1982 in Alkmaar, North Holland) is a Dutch former professional road bicycle racer, who rode professionally between 2005 and 2009. He rode in one Grand Tour, the 2006 Vuelta a España, finishing 125th overall.

Giling is the cousin of cyclists Matthé Pronk and Jos Pronk.

Major results

1999
 1st  Road race, National Junior Road Championships
2000
 3rd Road race, National Junior Road Championships
2001
 1st Stage 4 Mainfranken-Tour
2003
 1st Stage 4 Tour de Liège
 2nd Overall Boucles de la Mayenne
 3rd Scratch, National Track Championships
2004
 1st  Road race, National Under-23 Road Championships
 1st Prologue Thüringen Rundfahrt der U23
 2nd Overall Triptyque des Monts et Châteaux
1st Stage 2b
 2nd Paris–Roubaix Espoirs
 3rd Eschborn–Frankfurt Under–23
 3rd Overall Olympia's Tour
2007
 3rd Le Samyn
 8th Ronde van het Groene Hart

External links

Dutch male cyclists
1982 births
Living people
Sportspeople from Alkmaar
UCI Road World Championships cyclists for the Netherlands
Cyclists from North Holland
20th-century Dutch people
21st-century Dutch people